Rastykaylovka is a rural locality (a khutor) in Krivopolyanskoye Rural Settlement, Ostrogozhsky District, Voronezh Oblast, Russia. The population was 131 as of 2010. There are three streets.

Geography 
Rastykaylovka is located 29 km south of Ostrogozhsk (the district's administrative centre) by road. Krivaya Polyana is the nearest rural locality.

References 

Rural localities in Ostrogozhsky District